Marius Vazeilles (1881–1973) was a French archaeologist.

1881 births
1973 deaths
French archaeologists
20th-century archaeologists